List of Orthodox Archbishops of Suceava of the Romanian Patriarchate:

 Toader Arăpaşu (metropolitan of Suceava) (1977-1982)
 Pimen Zainea (first archbishop of Suceava) (24 June 1982 – 20 May 2020)

References 

Suceava